Linguère (or Lingeer in Serer and Wolof) is a town located in the Linguère Department, Louga Region of Senegal.

History 

Linguére was the capital of the Jolof Empire and its successor, the Kingdom of Jolof. The name Lingeer was also used as a title for Serer and Wolof queens and royal princesses.

Transport 
The town lies on the N3 road connecting it to Dakar and Touba to the west and Ouro Sogui and Mauretania to the east.

The town was formally the terminus of a branch railway. The train station is now in ruins and the tracks are non-existent as they have been ripped up and used by locals as part of fences.

Infrastructure 

The town has roughly 15,000 inhabitants, and is served by a weekly market that takes place on Fridays.
There are usually one or two US Peace Corps volunteers stationed in the town, and surrounding villages.
There is a post office, a bank, a small daily vegetable market, a bar, a sometimes running internet cafe, and several stores.
There is also a 'Gare Routiere', a public transit hub connecting the town to other cities in the east: Louga, Dahra, Touba, and Dakar.
The village of Nguith nearby is a traditional Wolof village (4 km to the west), with a deep-bore well, schools, health post, and functioning village government.  The village is run by two families, the Coundouls, and Talls.

In 2007, according to official estimates, Linguère had a population of 13,610.

References 
 
Daouda SOW(1933-2009), Former Deputy, Former Minister, Psychiatrist.

Djibo Leyti KA (1948-2017), Former Minister, Politician.

Aly Ngouille Ndiaye, City's Mayor, Minister Of Industries And Mines Of The Current Government.

Habib SY, Politician And Former Minister

Populated places in Louga Region
Communes of Senegal